The Pauwasi languages are a likely family of Papuan languages, mostly in Indonesia. The subfamilies are at best only distantly related. The best described Pauwasi language is Karkar, across the border in Papua New Guinea. They are spoken around the headwaters of the Pauwasi River in the Indonesian-PNG border region.

Based on earlier work, the East and West Pauwasi languages of Indonesia were classified together in Wurm (1975), though he (and later researchers) did not recognize that Yuri (Karkar) of Papua New Guinea was also East Pauwasi. That connection was made by Usher, though anthropologists had long known of the connection. Later the South Pauwasi languages were also identified by Usher, and the West Pauwasi family tentatively expanded.
Wichmann (2013), Foley (2018) and Pawley & Hammarström (2018), noting the sharp differences between the three groups, are agnostic about whether West Pauwasi, East Pauwasi and  South Pauwasi are related.

Languages
Pauwasi River
East
Emem–Karkar, Yafi (Zorop)
West
Dubu (Tebi), Towei
Namla–Tofanma
Usku (Afra)
Yetfa–South
Yetfa
South
Kimki
Lepki–Murkim: Lepki, Murkim, Kembra
? Molof (Poule)
The inclusion of Molof (Poule) is especially tentative (as of 2020).

The languages are not close: though the Eastern languages are clearly related, Yafi and Emumu are only 25% lexically similar. Pawley and Hammarström (2018) also question whether Eastern Pauwasi and Western Pauwasi are really related. They also note that Tebi and Towei are very different from each other, and may not necessarily group with each other.

Karkar-Yuri, long thought to be an isolate in Papua New Guinea, is clearly related and may actually form a dialect continuum with Emumu in Indonesia. On the other hand, the Western languages are so poorly attested that it is not certain that they are part of the Pauwasi family (or even related to each other), or if the common words are loans and they constitute a separate family or families, though a family connection appears likely.

The proto-forms of the pronouns have not been reconstructed. Attested forms include:

Yafi and Emumu are similar, and Dubu and Towei may share 1pl *numu, but there is not apparent connection between them.  Dubu no and Yafi nam might reflect pTNG *na, and Towei ngo pTNG *ga (*nga), and the plural pTNG *nu and *ni.

Classification
Stephen Wurm (1975) classified the Western (Indonesian) languages as a branch of the Trans–New Guinea (TNG) phylum, a position which Malcolm Ross (2005) tentatively retained. Ross's TNG classification is based on personal pronouns. Since no pronouns could be reconstructed from the available data on the poorly attested Indonesian Pauwasi languages, which were all that were recognized as Pauwasi at the time, only a tentative assessment could be made, based on a few lexical items.  Some of the pronouns of Dubu and Yafi look like they might be TNG. However, Ross counted Karkar, for which the pronouns were known, as an isolate because its pronouns did not pattern as TNG. At this stage its identity as a Pauwasi language was unknown.

Pawley and Hammarström (2018) do not consider there to be sufficient evidence for the Pauwasi languages to be classified as part of Trans-New Guinea, though they do note the following lexical resemblances between Tebi, Yafi, and proto-Trans-New Guinea.

Tebi ne ‘eat’ < *na-
Tebi mi, Yafi yemar ‘louse’ < *iman, *niman

Foley (2018) notes that Western Pauwasi has more Trans-New Guinea lexical similarities than East Pauwasi does. He notes that Karkar-Yuri shares some typological similarities with the Trans-New Guinea languages, which could be due to chance, contact, or genetic inheritance.

References

Further reading
Voorhoeve, C.L. Languages of Irian Jaya: Checklist. Preliminary classification, language maps, wordlists. B-31, iv + 133 pages. Pacific Linguistics, The Australian National University, 1975. 
Voorhoeve, C.L. "Miscellaneous Notes on Languages in West Irian, New Guinea". In Dutton, T., Voorhoeve, C. and Wurm, S.A. editors, Papers in New Guinea Linguistics No. 14. A-28:47-114. Pacific Linguistics, The Australian National University, 1971. 
Galis, Klaas Wilhelm. 1956. Ethnologische Survey van het Jafi-district (Onderafdeling Hollandia) [Ethnographic Survey of the Jafi-District (Hollandia Subdivision)]. Hollandia: Gouvernement van Nederlands Nieuw-Guinea. (contains word lists of both the West Pauwasi and East Pauwasi languages)

External links

Pauwasi languages database at TransNewGuinea.org

 
Papuan languages
Language families